Gracilibacillus halotolerans is a Gram-positive, extremely halotolerant bacteria, the type species of its genus. Its type strain is NNT (= DSM 11805T).

References

Further reading
Whitman, William B., et al., eds. Bergey's manual of systematic bacteriology. Vol. 3. Springer, 2012.
Logan, Niall A., and Paul De Vos, eds. Endospore-forming soil bacteria. Vol. 27. Springer, 2011.

External links

LPSN
Type strain of Gracilibacillus halotolerans at BacDive -  the Bacterial Diversity Metadatabase

Bacillaceae
Bacteria described in 1999
Halophiles